Andrei Igorevich Antonov (born April 27, 1985) is a Belarusian professional ice hockey defenceman. He currently plays for Yunost Minsk of the Belarusian Extraliga (BXL). He has previously played in the Kontinental Hockey League with HC Dynamo Minsk, Avtomobilist Yekaterinburg and HC Yugra.

External links

1985 births
Living people
Avtomobilist Yekaterinburg players
Belarusian ice hockey defencemen
HC Dinamo Minsk players
HC Shakhtyor Soligorsk players
HC Yugra players
Yunost Minsk players
People from Ramensky District
Sportspeople from Moscow Oblast